Romero Jucá Filho (born 30 November 1954) is a Brazilian politician and economist. He represented Roraima in the Federal Senate for 24 years, from 1995 to 2019. Previously, he was governor of Roraima from 1988 to 1990. He is a member of MDB. On 5 April 2016, he became the president of the MDB, succeeding Michel Temer.

Secret recording

On 23 May 2016, a secret recording emerged of minister Jucá, who is under investigation in the multibillion-dollar kickback scheme at state oil company Petrobras, discussing a purported pact to stall a huge corruption probe that has engulfed much of the nation. The secret tape also revealed him plotting to topple President Rousseff. After the newspaper O Globo, highly critical of Rousseff, posted an editorial urging the interim president to fire his right-hand man, Temer accepted the temporary departure of his minister.

References

Living people
1954 births
Politicians from Recife
Brazilian Social Democracy Party politicians
Democratic Social Party politicians
Brazilian Democratic Movement politicians
Governors of Roraima
Members of the Federal Senate (Brazil)